Ryan Lee Hall (born 27 November 1987) is an English professional rugby league footballer who plays as a er for Hull Kingston Rovers in the Betfred Super League, and for England and Great Britain at international level.

He previously played with Leeds Rhinos, winning the Super League Grand Final  in 2008, 2009, 2011, 2012, 2015 and 2017. In 2014 he was part of the Leeds team that won the Challenge Cup and was the winner of the Lance Todd Trophy. He also spent two seasons playing for the Sydney Roosters in the NRL.

Early years
Hall was born in Rothwell, West Yorkshire, England.

Hall joined the Leeds Academy in 2006 after being spotted playing for amateur club the Oulton Raiders by former Leeds coach John Daly. Daly contacted the then Academy boss John Bastian, who quickly invited Hall to the club for trials. He made eight appearances for the Junior Academy team in his début season, before quickly being selected for the Senior Academy team. He made eleven appearances for the Senior Academy team & scored three tries, including the Senior Academy Grand Final victory over Hull FC.

Playing career

Leeds

2007–2012

Hall made his Super League début coming off the bench at the 2007 Millennium Magic weekend at the Millennium Stadium in Cardiff in the controversial 42–38 victory over Bradford Bulls. Hall made his first start a fortnight later in the defeat at Hull F.C. & went on to make nine first team appearances in 2007, scoring three tries. He was not selected for Leeds 33-6 2007 Super League Grand Final victory against St. Helens though.

In 2008, Hall made sixteen appearances & scored nine tries, including a try in the 24-16 2008 Super League Grand Final victory, again against St. Helens.

In 2009, Hall became a regular in Leeds' first team as the team went on to win their third Grand Final in a row, 18-10, again against St Helens at Old Trafford.

Hall ended 2009 as the season's top try-scorer, with 31 tries in just 30 games in all competitions, including five tries in one game in a 76–12 win against Castleford Tigers. He was named Young Player of the Year, as well as runner-up in the Player of the Year award. He also received the Rugby League International Federation's Rookie of the Year award for 2009.

In 2010, Hall scored 31 tries in 33 appearances & was named in the Super League Dream Team for the second year in a row and featured in the 2010 World Club Challenge and 2010 Challenge Cup Final for Leeds. He played in the 2010 Challenge Cup Final defeat by the Warrington Wolves at Wembley Stadium.

Hall played on the wing and scored two tries for Leeds in the 2011 Challenge Cup Final defeat by the Wigan Warriors at Wembley Stadium. He also played in the 2011 Super League Grand Final victory over St. Helens at Old Trafford.

On 17 February 2012, Hall confirmed his standing as one of the premier wingers in rugby league when he scored 2 tries – including a 95-metre intercept try – and was named man-of-the-match in Leeds' 26–12 victory over Australian champions Manly-Warringah Sea Eagles in the 2012 World Club Challenge played at the home venue of Leeds, Headingley. Throughout the year he showed outstanding form, which earned him the award of being named the 'World's Best Winger'.

He played in the 2012 Challenge Cup Final defeat by the Warrington Wolves at Wembley Stadium, and in the 2012 Super League Grand Final victory over the Warrington Wolves at Old Trafford.

2013–2018

In 2014, Hall signed a new five-year deal for the Leeds Rhinos.

He played in the 2014 Challenge Cup Final victory over the Castleford Tigers at Wembley Stadium, Hall scoring two tries as Leeds beat Castleford, 23–10, and was voted the winner of the Lance Todd Trophy.

He played in the 2015 Challenge Cup Final victory over Hull Kingston Rovers at Wembley Stadium.

He played in the 2015 Super League Grand Final victory over the Wigan Warriors at Old Trafford.

He played in the 2017 Super League Grand Final victory over the Castleford Tigers at Old Trafford.

In July 2018, Hall agreed to join NRL side Sydney Roosters at the start of the 2019 season. A few weeks later, Hall played his last game for Leeds against Toulouse Olympique, suffering an ACL injury which ruled him out for the rest of the season.

Sydney Roosters
Hall signed a two-year contract with the Roosters, and was seen as a replacement on the wing for the departing Blake Ferguson.

Hall made his NRL debut for the Sydney Roosters against Brisbane in Round 10 of the 2019 NRL season which finished in a 15–10 loss at Suncorp Stadium.  The following week, Hall made his first appearance for North Sydney, the reserve grade side for Eastern Suburbs in the Canterbury Cup NSW.

Hall made six appearances for the Sydney Roosters scoring no tries.  He was not included in the club's finals campaign or the grand final team which defeated Canberra to win their second successive premiership.

Hall made just five appearances for the Sydney Roosters in the 2020 NRL season scoring no tries.  He was not included in the club's finals campaign and was subsequently released.

On 15 November 2020, Hull Kingston Rovers announced the signing of Hall to a two-year contract.

Hull Kingston Rovers
In round 1 of the 2021 Super League season, Hall made his debut for Hull Kingston Rovers.  After failing to score a try for two years, Hall scored a hat-trick in a 29–28 loss against Catalans Dragons.

In round 5 of the 2021 Super League season, he scored two tries in a 50–26 loss against Warrington.

In round 9 of the 2021 Super League season, Hall scored a hat-trick in Hull KR's 40–16 victory over Leigh.
Hall made a total of 20 appearances for Hull KR in the 2021 Super League season scoring 16 tries including one against the Catalans Dragons in the 2021 semi-final defeat at the Stade Gilbert Brutus He also made one appearance in the Challenge Cup.

International career
He earned a place in the England squad for the 2010 Four Nations tournament and although injury ruled him out of the first Test against New Zealand, he returned for the final game against Papua New Guinea. He also represented England in their 60–6 win over France.

Hall was also selected for the 2011 Four Nations, scoring 2 tries against Australia at Wembley in a 20–36 loss.

In 2013, Ryan was selected to help England's causes in the 2013 Rugby League World Cup. He was one of the best players in the tournament, earning himself a place on the wing in the RLIF team of the year. He scored eight tries in five matches for England. He had scored 21 tries in 20 games in total for England, which was a new record.

In November 2014, Hall played in the 2014 Four Nations. He was England's top try scorer in the tournament, scoring three tries. He scored his fifth try in four test matches against Australia, and he scored a double against New Zealand.

In October 2015, Hall was picked in a 24-man England squad to play against New Zealand in a three-match test-series. Beforehand though, England played a test match against France in Leigh. Hall scored two tries in a match where England would go on to dominate their opponents and thereon create a new record for the biggest winning margin against the 'Les Tricolores'.

The following year, Hall was picked in England's 24-man squad for the 2016 Four Nations. On 22 October 2016, Hall extended his England try scoring record, scoring another two tries against France in Avignon. In the Four Nations, Hall scored one try in each of England's games to keep his try scoring record for England in as many appearances.

In 2017, Ryan continued his try scoring form for England in a mid-season test match against Samoa in Australia. Later in the year, he was selected as a part of England's 24-man squad for the 2017 Rugby League World Cup.

He was selected in England 9s squad for the 2019 Rugby League World Cup 9s.

He was selected in squad for the 2019 Great Britain Lions tour of the Southern Hemisphere. He made his Great Britain test debut in the defeat by Tonga.

Hall was selected by England for the 2021 Rugby League World Cup. Hall was not included in England's opening round victory over Samoa, but was selected for the second group stage match. He scored two tries in England's 42–18 victory over France, the first of which was also his 300th career try.
In the third group stage match, Hall scored two tries in England's 94-4 victory over minnows Greece.

International Test caps and tries 
Matches do not include friendly matches or International Origin matches as these are unofficial test matches.

Honours

Domestic 
World Club Challenge (2): 2008, 2012
Super League (6): 2008, 2009, 2011, 2012, 2015, 2017
Challenge Cup (2): 2014, 2015
League Leaders' Shield (2): 2009, 2015

International 
Baskerville Shield (1): 2015

Career stats

References

External links
Hull Kingston Rovers profile
Sydney Roosters profile
Leeds Rhinos profile
Statistics at rugby-league.com
Bradford 38 - 42 Leeds
Statistics at rlwc2017.com
England profile

1987 births
Living people
England national rugby league team players
English rugby league players
Hull Kingston Rovers players
Lance Todd Trophy winners
Leeds Rhinos players
North Sydney Bears NSW Cup players
People from Rothwell, West Yorkshire
Rugby league players from Leeds
Rugby league wingers
Sydney Roosters players
Great Britain national rugby league team players